By the Dawn's Early Light and similar phrases could refer to:

"...By the Dawn's Early Light...", a phrase from the national anthem of the United States, "The Star-Spangled Banner"
By Dawn's Early Light, a 1990 cable television film directed by Jack Sholder
"By Dawn's Early Light", a 1974 episode of the American television series Columbo
By the Dawn's Early Light, a 1991 album by Harold Budd
The Dawn's Early Light, a 1972 book by Walter Lord